The Evansville Thunderbolts are a minor league ice hockey team in the Southern Professional Hockey League. The team plays at the Ford Center in Evansville, Indiana. The team replaced the Evansville IceMen of the ECHL.

History
During the 2015–16 season, the City of Evansville and the owner of the ECHL's Evansville IceMen, Ron Geary, were unable to agree to a new lease for the IceMen to continue to operate out of the Ford Center. On January 19, 2016, Geary announced that he had agreed to terms with the nearby city of Owensboro, Kentucky to relocate the team to the Owensboro Sports Center.

On February 8, 2016, Evansville mayor, Lloyd Winnecke, announced that local businessman and IceMen season ticket holder, Mike Hall, had secured an expansion team in the Southern Professional Hockey League to play at the Ford Center beginning in the 2016–17 season, thus displacing the IceMen franchise from Evansville. On March 1, the City of Evansville and the new team signed a five-year lease agreement to play at the Ford Center. Hall would act as general manager while the majority owner was VW Sports, LLC., a subsidiary of VenuWorks, Inc., the arena management company.

On March 22, 2016, former IceMen head coach Jeff Pyle was announced as the head coach for its inaugural season. The new team name was announced on April 15, 2016, taken from the P-47 Thunderbolt fighter aircraft which was manufactured in Evansville during the Second World War. Near the end of the first season, Mike Hall sold his portion of the team to VW Sports, LLC. and Pete Xander was named the new general manager for the 2017–18 season.

After two seasons, head coach Pyle left for the head coaching position with the Atlanta Gladiators of the ECHL. Pyle was replaced by former NHL player Ian Moran as head coach and Adam Stio was named general manager for the 2018–19 season. The team finished in last place and general manager Stio was fired at the end of the season and Moran resigned. Longtime SPHL head coach Jeff Bes was hired as the head coach for the 2019–20 season, while Patrick Kelly was hired as the new general manager. The 2019–20 SPHL season was curtailed by the onset of the COVID-19 pandemic while the Thunderbolts were in a position to qualify for the playoffs.

Due to the ongoing effects and restrictions during the pandemic, the Thunderbolts were one of five SPHL teams to not participate in the 2020–21 season. Before returning for the 2021–22 season, the Thunderbolts hired Bob McNamara as the general manager.

Season-by-season records

See also

Sports in Evansville

References

External links
Evansville Thunderbolts website
SPHL website

Southern Professional Hockey League teams
Sports in Evansville, Indiana
Ice hockey clubs established in 2016
Ice hockey teams in Indiana
2016 establishments in Indiana